The 2020–21 ECHL season was the 33rd season of the ECHL. Due to the ongoing restrictions in the COVID-19 pandemic, the start of the regular season was pushed back to December 11, 2020.

The Fort Wayne Komets were the Kelly Cup champions, defeating the South Carolina Stingrays in four games.

League business 

Due to the uncertainty of being able to host games in some locations caused by the COVID-19 pandemic, several member teams had not been able to confirm participation in the 2020–21 season and the season start was postponed. In October 2020, thirteen teams confirmed plans to begin to play in December 2020 with others hoping to return in January 2021. All teams had a deadline to voluntarily opt out of the 2020–21 season by November 30, but two teams had been granted extensions: the Fort Wayne Komets and Toledo Walleye. The Komets and Walleye were then approved to postpone their start to February. The league announced its schedule through February 11, 2021.

By December 7, 2020, the other eleven teams had opted out from participating in the season and voluntarily suspended operations: the Adirondack Thunder, Atlanta Gladiators, Brampton Beast, Cincinnati Cyclones, Idaho Steelheads, Kalamazoo Wings, Maine Mariners, Newfoundland Growlers, Norfolk Admirals, Reading Royals, and Worcester Railers. On January 5, 2021, the league announced that Toledo had opted out of the season as well, but that Fort Wayne had finalized plans to start playing on February 12. The league announced a conference-based alignment and its schedule through April 4. The league announced a remainder of the schedule on February 10. Due to COVID-19 related postponements and teams' arenas availability, several games throughout the season were rescheduled or cancelled.

During the season, the Brampton Beast announced the team had ceased operations entirely on February 18, 2021.

Affiliation changes

All-star game
During the previous season, the league had awarded the Jacksonville Icemen the 2021 All-Star Game, but the Jacksonville-hosted event was deferred to 2022.

Standings
Due to the imbalanced schedule during the pandemic, teams are ranked on points percentage.

Final standings

 – clinched playoff spot;  – clinched regular season conference title;  – Brabham Cup (regular season) champion

Postseason
For the 2021 Kelly Cup playoffs, the top four teams from each conference at the end of the regular season qualified for the postseason. The playoff format is a three-round best-of-five tournament for each series. The postseason began on June 7.

Bracket

Awards

All-ECHL teams

First Team
Jake Hildebrand (G) – Florida
Samuel Jardine (D) – Greenville
Les Lancaster (D) – Allen
Anthony Beauregard (F) – Wichita
Aaron Luchuk (F) – Orlando
John McCarron (F) – Florida

Second Team
Evan Buitenhuis (G) – Wichita
Matt Register (D) – Allen
Dean Stewart (D) – Wichita
Tyler Coulter (F) – Rapid City
Peter Quenneville (F) – Rapid City
Cole Ully (F) – South Carolina

All-Rookie
Evan Weninger (G) – Wichita
Ben Finkelstein (D) – Greenville
Dean Stewart (D) – Wichita
Matthew Boucher (F) – Utah
Jay Dickman (F) – Wichita
Joseph Garreffa (F) – Orlando

See also 
2020 in sports
2021 in sports

References

External links
ECHL website

 ECHL season
2020-21
3
Ice hockey events curtailed due to the COVID-19 pandemic